The N80 road is a national secondary road in Ireland that runs southeastwards from its junction with the N52 and R443 in the town of Tullamore in County Offaly, to the N30 at Ballynahallin, just north of Enniscorthy in County Wexford, a distance of 114.683 km.

Upgrading
In common with most National secondary routes, the N80 is a simple two lane road without hard shoulders for much of its route. Some of the worst bends may have been removed through the years and some junctions improved, but general pavement quality is rather poor. No improvements of existing sections are scheduled. 

Earlier works of note on the N80 include:
 Bypass of Tullamore (N52) and Moate (M6) involved the designation of some 26 km of N80 to R road resulting in a reduction in its total length.
 Mountmellick inner relief road - project appears to have been abandoned. 
 Realigned section where it crosses over the M7 (Completed late 1990s).
 Kildavin bypass (completed in the 1990s it involved passing over the village and bridging over the R724)
 Southern terminus of the N80 at the N11 converted from a simple T-junction to a roundabout (2008).
 N80 Link Road dual carriageway acts as an effective extension from its southern terminus at the N11 to junction 25 of the M11 motorway in Ballydawmore via the N30 road. (Opened 18 July 2019).

Tullamore bypass

The Tullamore bypass is a new  single carriageway upgrade to the N52. A spur designated part of the R443 was constructed from the northern section of the route to the Tullamore Western Relief Road forming a near complete orbital route around Tullamore. The N80 now terminates at the N52 junction on the bypass; traffic heading for Athlone now takes the N52 north to the M6 motorway at Kilbeggan.

See also
Roads in Ireland 
Motorways in Ireland
National primary road
Regional road

References

Roads Act 1993 (Classification of National Roads) Order 2006 – Department of Transport

National secondary roads in the Republic of Ireland
Roads in County Westmeath
Roads in County Offaly
Roads in County Laois
Roads in County Carlow
Roads in County Wexford